Elmer L. "Babe" Doty (December 17, 1867 in Lyons, New York} – November 20, 1929 in Toledo, Ohio) was a pitcher in Major League Baseball. He played one game for the Toledo Maumees in 1890, giving up just one run in nine innings.

Sources

1867 births
1929 deaths
Baseball players from New York (state)
Major League Baseball pitchers
Toledo Maumees players
19th-century baseball players
Saginaw (minor league baseball) players
Youngstown Giants players
Grand Rapids Shamrocks players
Jackson Jaxons players
Findlay Sluggers players
Lansing Senators players
Guelph Maple Leafs players
Chatham Reds players
Saginaw Braves players
People from Lyons, New York